Leonid Denisovich Kizim (5 August 1941 – 14 June 2010) was a Soviet cosmonaut.

Biography 
Kizim was born in Krasnyi Lyman, Donetsk Oblast, Soviet Union (now Lyman, Ukraine). He graduated from Higher Air Force School in 1975; and served as a test pilot in the Soviet Air Force. He was selected as a cosmonaut on October 23, 1965. Kizim flew as Commander on Soyuz T-3, Soyuz T-10 and Soyuz T-15, and also served as backup commander for Soyuz T-2. All together he spent 374 days 17 hours 56 minutes in space. On Soyuz T-15, he was part of the only crew to visit two space stations on one spaceflight (Mir and Salyut 7). He later served as Deputy Director Satellite Control-Center of the Russian Ministry of Defense; after May 1995 he was Director of the Military Engineering Academy of Aeronautics and Astronautics in St. Petersburg.

He left the cosmonaut program on June 13, 1987, but remained in the Soviet Air Force, and later the Russian Air Force. In 1993, he was placed in charge of the A.F. Mozhaysky Military-Space Academy. He held that position until he retired from the Russian Air Force on September 10, 2001, at the rank of Colonel General.

Kizim died on June 14, 2010. He left a wife and two children. Leonid Kizim was married with two children.

Awards 
He was awarded:
Twice Hero of the Soviet Union (December 10, 1980 and October 2, 1984);
Pilot-Cosmonaut of the USSR
Order of Honour
Order of Friendship
Three Orders of Lenin
Medal "For the Development of Virgin Lands" 
Foreign awards:
Order of Sukhbaatar (Mongolia);
Medal "30 Years of Victory over Japan's Militarists" (Mongolia);
Medal "60 Years of the Mongolian People's Revolution";
Knight of the Legion of Honour (France);
Kirti Chakra (India);
Order of Merit (Ukraine).

References

External links
 KIZIM, Col.-Gen. Leonid Denisovich International Who's Who. accessed September 4, 2006.
 Leonid Denissovich Kizim, astronautix.com
 The official website of the city administration Baikonur - Honorary citizens of Baikonur

1941 births
2010 deaths
People from Lyman, Ukraine
Soviet cosmonauts
Ukrainian emigrants to Russia
Heroes of the Soviet Union
Soviet Air Force generals
Soviet colonel generals
Recipients of the Order of Lenin
Recipients of the Order of Honour (Russia)
Recipients of the Order of Merit (Ukraine), 3rd class
Commandeurs of the Légion d'honneur
Burials in Troyekurovskoye Cemetery
Salyut program cosmonauts
Spacewalkers
Mir crew members